Same Eyez On Me is an unreleased studio album by American rapper Petey Pablo.

Background
In July 2005, press releases on MTV and VH1 publicized a then upcoming album to be released by Petey Pablo, entitled, "Same Eyez On Me." According to MTV and VH1, Same Eyez On Me was expected to be a Death Row Records release with Timbaland and Lil Jon assisting with production.

Track listing
"We R Blown" - 4:31
"Same Eyez On Me" - 3:46
"Everywhere I Go" - 4:11
"I'm Makin' Moves" - 3:32
"I'll Beat Yo Azz" (Feat. Kurupt) - 3:30
"It Ain't Fair" - 4:21
"So Crazy" (Feat. 2Pac) - 3:13
"Push It Away"(Feat. Wes Cyphers) - 4:22
"Too Much" (Feat. Eastwood & Kurupt) - 3:25
"Somebody About To Get It" - 4:40
"Set The Record Straight" - 4:32
"Simple And Plain" - 3:51
"Holla At Ya Folkz" - 4:10
"Let's Do It" - 3:00
"What Cha Gonna Do?" - 3:36
"Thats Why" - 4:10
"In Your Casket" - 3:45
"In A Minute" - 3:10

References

Unreleased albums